Dolly Dimples was a 1909 publicity stunt in Salt Lake City by the (since defunct) Salt Lake Herald-Republican newspaper, involving a pretty girl in a new automobile, in this case an American Traveler. A $500 reward (roughly $25,000 in 2008 dollars) was offered for the "capture" of Miss Dolly Dimples. Miss Dimples was played by Mrs. Mary Ellen Curry née Goodman No record is available of the outcome of the contest.

Notes and references

External links

 Dolly Dimples photo archive

Advertising techniques
Culture of Salt Lake City
History of Salt Lake City
Advertising in the United States
1909 in Utah
Publicity stunts